Shaun Playford Burgoyne (born 21 October 1982) is a former Australian rules footballer who played with the Port Adelaide Football Club in the SANFL, and Port Adelaide and Hawthorn Football Club in the Australian Football League (AFL).

Burgoyne was the first Indigenous Australian player in elite Australian rules football (the VFL/AFL, the SANFL and the WAFL) player to reach the 400-game milestone, as well as the fifth player overall in the VFL/AFL, and   the seventh player overall in elite Australian rules football. He was also the first VFL/AFL player to have reached the milestone playing for two different clubs.

With 35 AFL finals appearances, Burgoyne also had the third most finals appearances of any VFL/AFL footballer, behind only Michael Tuck's 39 and Joel Selwood’s 40. Burgoyne also played four finals matches in the SANFL, with his total of 39 finals appearances across the SANFL and AFL the second most in elite Australian rules football, behind only Peter Carey's 43.

Early life 
Burgoyne is the younger brother of former Port Adelaide player Peter Burgoyne and the son of former Port Adelaide (SANFL) player Peter Burgoyne Snr. But Shaun's story starts in Darwin, in a house in Leanyer that he still likes to drive past on trips back to the Northern Territory. Shaun moved away from Darwin when he was young and moved to the small city of Port Lincoln in the Eyre Peninsula region of South Australia. He played his junior football for Mallee Park in the Port Lincoln Football League where he played alongside AFL greats such as Eddie Betts, Lindsay Thomas, Byron Picket and Graham Johncock.

A proud Kokatha-Warai man, family is at the heart of everything Shaun does. He is of Indigenous Australian descent and his ancestry can be traced to the Kokatha clan.

AFL career

Port Adelaide career (2001–2009)
Drafted with pick 12 in the 2000 national draft, Burgoyne would have to wait a year to make his AFL debut in round 3, 2002 against St Kilda. He had been a steady contributor across the forward line for Port Adelaide, before becoming a rebounding defender to great effect.

In 2004 Burgoyne played every game for the season and was part of Port Adelaide's inaugural AFL premiership.

After a series of midfield performances that culminated with selection to the All Australian Team in 2006, he was described by retiring Port player Josh Francou as being "as good as Judd".

Burgoyne was important in Port Adelaide's midfield in 2008, despite attracting the opposition's best tagger most weeks. While not reaching the heights of past seasons, he finished fourth in the best and fairest and was second at the club in centre clearances, tackles and inside 50s, and fourth in goals (23), contested possessions and bounces. 
2009 was a disappointing year after injuring his knee in round three and missing three months of footy. He was able to come back and play a few good games late in the year.

Burgoyne was Port Adelaide’s highest paid player and Vice-Captain at the end of the 2009 season.

Hawthorn career (2010–2021) 
As vice-captain, he shocked Port Adelaide by requesting a trade to play for a Victorian team in 2010 after his brother retired. Port traded him to Hawthorn in a complicated deal involving four clubs, with Essendon and Geelong also involved. He was allocated former club champion Shane Crawford's No. 9 jumper.

After having surgery on his knee during the offseason that delayed his preparation for the 2010 season, Burgoyne suffered a broken jaw while playing for Box Hill, and later suffered a hamstring injury. Despite these injuries, he made his debut against Richmond in Round 8, 2010, and played the last sixteen games of the season.

During 2011, Shaun Burgoyne played excellent football for Hawthorn, showcasing his disposal and running skills. He was part of a side that lost the preliminary final to eventual runners-up Collingwood by three points.

Burgoyne was part of Hawthorn's losing side in the 2012 AFL Grand Final. In 2013, Burgoyne's performance in the Preliminary Final against Geelong saw him kick three goals and also provide goals assists, with his final goal putting Hawthorn back in front late in the fourth quarter. The match ended the 11-game losing streak against Geelong that had been active since Hawthorns' 2008 Grand Final win over them.

On 28 September 2013, Burgoyne became a dual Premiership player after Hawthorn defeated Fremantle in the Grand Final in front of 100,007 fans at the MCG: Burgoyne was the only player to remain completely in his game outfit when the players were presented on stage following the conclusion of the post-match concert.

With Hawthorn's victories in the 2014 and 2015 Grand Finals, completing a hat-trick, Burgoyne became a quadruple Premiership player.

On 24 May 2017, it was announced that he would wear number 67 on his guernsey, rather than his usual 9, for the round 10 Sir Doug Nicholls Round (the "Indigenous Round") game against , to commemorate the 1967 referendum which allowed Indigenous Australians to be counted with the general population in the census.

On 28 August 2017, Burgoyne signed a one-year contract extension with Hawthorn keeping him at the club until the end of 2018. In November, he was appointed captain of the Australian international rules football team for the 2017 series.

Burgoyne signed another contract extension to cover the 2019 season in August 2018. 

In 2019, Burgoyne was heavily linked to a move to the Gold Coast. Burgoyne himself addressed the speculation, admitting it had been stressful and that he had a big decision to make. On 12 September, it was announced he would remain a Hawk for 2020.

At the end of the 2020 season, Burgoyne signed a one-year deal extending his career into a twentieth season in the AFL, and announced that it would be his last.

As of 2022, Burgoyne ranks third for most VFL/AFL games, behind Brent Harvey (432) and Michael Tuck (426),  while he ranks second for most premiership games in elite Australian rules football with 433 (including his 26 SANFL games for Port Adelaide), only behind Craig Bradley (464,  including 89 games in the SANFL with Port Adelaide).

Post-playing media career 2022-
On March 7, 2022, it was announced that Shaun would join Channel 7's commentary team as a boundary rider.

Off-field representation
Off the field, Burgoyne has become an important representative for the Indigenous Australian sporting community. He was an inaugural member of the Indigenous Players Advisory Board when it was established in 2011 and was appointed Chair of the Board in 2016.

He was also a regular guest on The Marngrook Footy Show.

Personal life
Burgoyne is married to Amy née Phillips, who is the daughter of Port Adelaide legend Greg Phillips and sister of WNBA and AFLW superstar Erin Phillips. Together they have four children – Nixie, Leni, Ky and Percy.

Statistics

|- style=background:#EAEAEA
| 2001 ||  || 37
| 0 || — || — || — || — || — || — || — || — || — || — || — || — || — || — || 0
|-
| 2002 ||  || 8
| 17 || 24 || 11 || 86 || 58 || 144 || 32 || 41 || 1.4 || 0.6 || 5.1 || 3.4 || 8.5 || 1.9 || 2.4 || 3
|- style=background:#EAEAEA
| 2003 ||  || 8
| 25 || 39 || 17 || 174 || 106 || 280 || 76 || 66 || 1.6 || 0.7 || 7.0 || 4.2 || 11.2 || 3.0 || 2.6 || 1
|- 
| style="background:khaki;"| 2004# ||  || 8
| 25 || 18 || 14 || 215 || 130 || 345 || 77 || 79 || 0.7 || 0.6 || 8.6 || 5.2 || 13.8 || 3.1 || 3.2 || 1
|- style=background:#EAEAEA
| 2005 ||  || 8
| 15 || 4 || 4 || 159 || 118 || 277 || 76 || 29 || 0.3 || 0.3 || 10.6 || 7.9 || 18.5 || 5.1 || 1.9 || 7
|- 
| 2006 ||  || 8
| 22 || 20 || 16 || 265 || 193 || 458 || 87 || 115 || 0.9 || 0.7 || 12.0 || 8.8 || 20.8 || 4.0 || 5.2 || 15
|- style=background:#EAEAEA
| 2007 ||  || 8
| 25 || 39 || 23 || 271 || 201 || 472 || 62 || 94 || 1.6 || 0.9 || 10.8 || 8.0 || 18.9 || 2.5 || 3.8 || 16
|-
| 2008 ||  || 8
| 19 || 23 || 12 || 216 || 168 || 384 || 66 || 81 || 1.2 || 0.6 || 11.4 || 8.8 || 20.2 || 3.5 || 4.3 || 6
|- style=background:#EAEAEA
| 2009 ||  || 8
| 9 || 4 || 10 || 100 || 75 || 175 || 33 || 35 || 0.4 || 1.1 || 11.1 || 8.3 || 19.4 || 3.7 || 3.9 || 0
|- 
| 2010 ||  || 9
| 16 || 7 || 3 || 172 || 187 || 359 || 58 || 89 || 0.4 || 0.2 || 10.8 || 11.7 || 22.4 || 3.6 || 5.6 || 7
|- style=background:#EAEAEA
| 2011 ||  || 9
| 24 || 16 || 9 || 230 || 212 || 442 || 90 || 77 || 0.7 || 0.4 || 9.6 || 8.8 || 18.4 || 3.8 || 3.2 || 0
|- 
| 2012 ||  || 9
| 24 || 11 || 5 || 246 || 182 || 428 || 83 || 82 || 0.5 || 0.2 || 10.3 || 7.6 || 17.8 || 3.5 || 3.4 || 6
|- style=background:#EAEAEA
| style="background:khaki;"| 2013# ||  || 9
| 23 || 18 || 6 || 258 || 203 || 461 || 81 || 86 || 0.8 || 0.3 || 11.2 || 8.8 || 20.0 || 3.5 || 3.7 || 3
|-
| style="background:khaki;"| 2014# ||  || 9
| 25 || 12 || 6 || 284 || 266 || 550 || 95 || 95 || 0.5 || 0.2 || 11.4 || 10.6 || 22.0 || 3.8 || 3.8 || 3
|- style=background:#EAEAEA
| style="background:khaki;"| 2015# ||  || 9
| 26 || 9 || 7 || 244 || 260 || 504 || 92 || 102 || 0.4 || 0.3 || 9.4 || 10.0 || 19.4 || 3.5 || 3.9 || 2
|-
| 2016 ||  || 9
| 24 || 15 || 12 || 262 || 216 || 478 || 93 || 134 || 0.6 || 0.5 || 10.9 || 9.0 || 19.9 || 3.9 || 5.6 || 8
|- style=background:#EAEAEA
| 2017 ||  || 9/67
| 22 || 17 || 10 || 216 || 232 || 448 || 93 || 87 || 0.8 || 0.5 || 9.8 || 10.5 || 20.4 || 4.2 || 4.0 || 5
|-
| 2018 ||  || 9
| 17 || 7 || 13 || 165 || 151 || 316 || 64 || 72 || 0.4 || 0.8 || 9.8 || 8.9 || 18.6 || 3.8 || 4.2 || 0
|- style=background:#EAEAEA
| 2019 ||  || 9
| 18 || 7 || 3 || 175 || 117 || 292 || 77 || 65 || 0.4 || 0.2 || 9.7 || 6.5 || 16.2 || 4.3 || 3.6 || 0
|-
| 2020 ||  || 9
| 13 || 11 || 2 || 77 || 62 || 139 || 26 || 32 || 0.8 || 0.2 || 5.9 || 4.8 || 10.7 || 2.0 || 2.5 || 2
|- style=background:#EAEAEA
| 2021 ||  || 9
| 18 || 1 || 1 || 133 || 84 || 217 || 46 || 31 || 0.1 || 0.1 || 7.4 || 4.7 || 12.1 || 2.6 || 1.7 || 0
|- class="sortbottom"
! colspan=3| Career
! 407 !! 302 !! 184 !! 3948 !! 3221 !! 7169 !! 1407 !! 1492 !! 0.7 !! 0.5 !! 9.7 !! 7.9 !! 17.6 !! 3.5 !! 3.7 !! 85
|}

Notes

Honours and achievements
Team
 AFL premiership player: 2004
 3× AFL premiership player: 2013, 2014, 2015
 3× Minor premiership: 2002, 2003, 2004
 2× Minor premiership: 2012, 2013

Individual
 All-Australian team: 2006
 Showdown Medal: Round 20, 2005
  most consistent player: 2014
 2× Australia international rules football team: 2008, 2017
 Australia international rules football team captain: 2017
 4× Indigenous All-Stars team: 2005, 2007, 2009, 2015
 Indigenous All-Stars captain: 2015
 Polly Farmer medal: 2015
 Dream Team Australian rules football team: 2008
  life member

See also 
 List of VFL/AFL players to have played 300 games
 List of VFL/AFL players to have played 200 games for one club

References

External links 
 
 

1982 births
Living people
Port Adelaide Football Club players
Port Adelaide Football Club Premiership players
Hawthorn Football Club players
Hawthorn Football Club Premiership players
Port Adelaide Magpies players
Port Adelaide Football Club players (all competitions)
Indigenous Australian players of Australian rules football
All-Australians (AFL)
Australian rules footballers from South Australia
Australia international rules football team players
Four-time VFL/AFL Premiership players
People from Port Lincoln